Kirkesnesmoen Chapel is a parish church of the Church of Norway in Målselv Municipality in Troms og Finnmark county, Norway. It is located along the Målselva river about halfway between the villages of Bardufoss and Skjold. It is an annex church for the Øverbygd parish which is part of the Senja prosti (deanery) in the Diocese of Nord-Hålogaland. The white, wooden church was built in a long church style in 1975 by the architect Nils Gang at the architecture firm Harry Gangvik A/S. The church seats about 220 people.

See also
List of churches in Nord-Hålogaland

References

Målselv
Churches in Troms
Wooden churches in Norway
20th-century Church of Norway church buildings
Churches completed in 1975
1975 establishments in Norway
Long churches in Norway